Desert Yard is a part of the Union Pacific Railroad (formerly Southern Pacific) freight yard located in West Oakland, California. It is bordered on the east by a residential/warehouse district and on the west by the Oakland Army Base. It also lies underneath a tangling mass of freeway interchanges, notably the 880, 580, and San Francisco–Oakland Bay Bridge connection. All of these freeway interchanges were built after the Cypress Freeway, initially located seven blocks to the east of Desert Yard, collapsed during the 1989 Loma Prieta earthquake. Local lore among railroaders is that Desert Yard got its name because there was no water tank available to refill steam locomotives back in the early part of the twentieth century when it was a much larger and much more integral part of the region's railroading.

Rail yards in the United States
Properties of the Union Pacific Railroad
Rail transportation in Oakland, California
Transportation buildings and structures in Alameda County, California